Robert Charles Sands (May 11, 1799 – December 16, 1832) was an American writer and poet.

Biography
Robert Charles Sands was born in Brooklyn, New York on May 11, 1799, the son of Auditor-General Comfort Sands. He was a scholar and a writer of many literary types, but without much originality. His best work is considered to be in his short stories. His most well-known poem is Yamoyden which is an Indian story written in collaboration with a friend. He is considered part of the "Knickerbocker group", which also included Washington Irving, William Cullen Bryant, James Kirke Paulding, Gulian Crommelin Verplanck, Fitz-Greene Halleck, Joseph Rodman Drake, Lydia M. Child, and Nathaniel Parker Willis.

He died in Hoboken, New Jersey on December 16, 1832.

References

External links
 George and Evert Duyckinck: Robert Charles Sands, in: Cyclopedia of American Literature (1856), 2:371-373.

1799 births
1832 deaths
19th-century American poets
American male poets
19th-century American male writers
Knickerbocker Group
People from Flatbush, Brooklyn